The Strobridge Lithographing Company was a maker of advertisement posters and lithographs founded in 1847 in Cincinnati, Ohio. The company is named after Hines Strobridge who only joined the then stationery store in 1854 when it was known as Middleton, Wallace and Company, after its founding partners E. C. Middleton and W. R. Wallace. In 1859, the company changed its name to Middleton, Strobridge and Company. Strobridge acquired full ownership from his partners after the American Civil War. He built the company's first factory in 1884 on the Miami–Erie Canal in the Cincinnati neighborhood of Over-the-Rhine. Strobridge lithographs later became a popular method of advertisement for circuses and theaters.

References

Further reading

External links 
 

1847 establishments in Ohio
Defunct companies based in Cincinnati